Wang Hao (Chinese: 王皓; Pinyin: Wáng Hào; born 18 February 1989) is a Chinese football player.

Club career
Wang started his football career in 2009 when he was promoted to Beijing Guoan's first team squad. The following season in an attempt to gain more playing time Wang was loaned to Beijing Guoan's satellite team Beijing Guoan Talent, which would play as a foreign team in Singapore's S.League in 2010. He made his senior debut in a 3–1 away victory against Geylang United on 12 March 2010 and scored his senior goal in a 4–1 home victory against Home United 7 days later. Wang made 30 appearances in scored 6 goals in the 2010 S.League season.

Wang returned to Beijing Guoan in 2011. On 18 July 2012, he made his debut for Beijing Guoan on the fourth round of 2012 Chinese FA Cup which Beijing beat Qingdao Jonoon 6–0 at Workers Stadium, coming on as a substitute for Frédéric Kanouté in the 60th minute. He made his Super League debut on 8 March 2013, in the first round of 2013 Chinese Super League season, which Beijing Guoan beat Shanghai East Asia 4–1, coming on as a substitute for Wang Xiaolong in the 84th minute. Wang was released by Beijing at the end of 2015 season.

Career statistics
Statistics accurate as of match played 1 November 2015

References

External links
WANG HAO at Soccerway.com

1989 births
Living people
Sportspeople from Luoyang
Chinese footballers
Footballers from Henan
Beijing Guoan F.C. players
Chinese Super League players
Singapore Premier League players
Association football midfielders